The Geological Survey of India (GSI) is a scientific agency of India. It was founded in 1851, as a Government of India organization under the Ministry of Mines, one of the oldest of such organisations in the world and the second oldest survey in India after the Survey of India (founded in 1767), for conducting geological surveys and studies of India, and also as the prime provider of basic earth science information to government, industry and general public, as well as the official participant in steel, coal, metals, cement, power industries and international geoscientific forums.

History

Formed in 1851 by East India Company, the organization's roots can be traced to 1836 when the "Coal Committee", followed by more such committees, was formed to study and explore the availability of coal in the eastern parts of India. David Hiram Williams, one of the first surveyors for the British Geological Survey, was appointed 'Surveyor of coal districts and superintendent of coal works, Bengal' on 3 December 1845 and arrived in India the following February. The phrase "Geological Survey of India" was first used on his Dec 1847 map of the Damoodah and Adji Great Coal Field, together with Horizontal and Vertical sections of the map. On 4 February 1848, he was appointed the "Geological Surveyor of the Geological Survey of India", but he fell off his elephant and, soon after, died with his assistant, F. B. Jones, of 'jungle fever' on 15 November 1848, after which John McClelland took over as the "Officiating Surveyor" until his retirement on 5 March 1851.

Until 1852, Geological Survey primarily remained focused on exploration for coal, mainly for powering steam transport, oil reserves, and ore deposits, when Sir Thomas Oldham, father of Richard Dixon Oldham, broadened the ambit of the scope of functioning of the Geological Survey of India by advancing the argument with the government that it was not possible to find coal without first mapping the geology of India. Thus, the Geological Survey commenced to map the rock types, geological structures and relative ages of different rock types . The age of rock strata was estimated from the presence of index fossils, which consumed much of the geologists' efforts in finding these index fossils, as the method of Radiometric dating for estimating the age of rock strata was not developed at that time. In 1869 Frederick Richard Mallet was first to visit Ramgarh crater. Later studies include by those of Arthur Lennox Coulson

In 19th century GSI undertook several surveys including Great Trigonometrical Survey, 1869 Kailash-Mansarovar expedition, 1871-1872 Shigache–Lhasa expedition,  1873-1874 Yarkand–Kashgar expedition, second expedition of this area by Sir Thomas Douglas Forsyth, 1878-1882 Darjeeling–Lhasa–Mongolia expedition, etc. The native surveyors were called pandit, some notable ones include cousins Nain Singh Rawat and Krishna Singh Rawat.

In 19th and early 20th century GSI made important contributions to Seismology by its studies and detailed reports on numerous Indian earthquakes. Richard Dixon Oldham, like his father also worked for GSI, first correctly identified p- and s-waves, and hypothesised and calculated the diameter of the Earth's core.

On 8 April 2017 GSI began pilot project, with the first ever aerial survey of mineral stocks by GSI, to map the mineral stocks up to a depth of 20 km using specially-equipped aircraft.

The GSI was restructured into 5 Missions, respectively relating to "Baseline Surveys";"Mineral resource Assessments";"Geoinformatics";"Multi-disciplinary Geosciences"; and "Training and Capacity Building",  on the basis of the Report of a High-level Committee chaired by Mr S.Vijay Kumar Additional Secretary in the Ministry of Mines of the Government of India.

The superintendents and directors

See also
 List of National Geological Monuments in India

References

External links

Geography of India
National geological agencies
Geology of India
Geological surveys
Organisations based in Kolkata
Geographic history of India
Executive branch of the government of India
Organizations established in 1851
1851 establishments in India
1851 establishments in British India
Ministry of Mines (India)